Daniel Lencina-Ribes (born 5 February 1977) is a retired professional tennis player who is born in Alicante, Spain. He got by presidential decree, from president Paksas, the Lithuanian nationality. Represented Lithuania at international tennis tournaments. He was number one from Lithuania in the ATP ranking for 322 weeks and a member of Lithuania Davis Cup team for five years.  At the moment he is married and lives in Germany where after being the director of the Lencina tennis school, he is working as a clinical psychologist in a psychiatric hospital.

ITF Men's Circuit career finals

Doubles

Davis Cup 
He was a member of the Lithuania Davis Cup team, he has an 11–4 record in singles and an 8–5 record in doubles in 20 ties played. Also, he was partnering Rolandas Muraška and  Gvidas Sabeckis, making with the last one of the best doubles team that ever represented Lithuania, together they have a 6–4 record.

References

External links 
 
 
 

Lithuanian male tennis players
1977 births
Living people